Vets for Change is a fully registered UK charitable organisation that was set up to provide financial and logistical support to community animal welfare projects around the world.

History 
Vets for Change was founded in 2012 and expanded in 2013 to run a mass rabies vaccination and sterilisation campaign in South Africa.  In 2014, Vets for Change successfully completed mass sterilisation and vaccination projects in Mpumalanga and Limpopo and have since been approached for help running further projects in Kuching, Borneo and to return to Mpumalanga in 2015. Vets for Change became a fully UK registered charity in May 2015 and has since run two more mass canine rabies vaccination campaigns in South Africa

See also
 Animal ethics
 Animal rights
 Cruelty to animals

References

External links
The Vets for Change website

Animal charities based in the United Kingdom
Animal welfare organisations based in the United Kingdom
Organisations based in Cheltenham
Veterinary medicine in the United Kingdom